Raymond Georges Lesage (27 June 1917 – 3 February 2006) was a French racewalker. He competed in the men's 50 kilometres walk at the 1952 Summer Olympics.

References

1917 births
2006 deaths
Athletes (track and field) at the 1952 Summer Olympics
French male racewalkers
Olympic athletes of France